The 2008 Vilnius NATO meeting was an informal, two-day meeting of Defense Ministers of NATO nations held in Vilnius, Lithuania, from February 7 until February 8, 2008. The most important topics discussed were the War in Afghanistan, the possible admission into NATO of Ukraine, and the relationship with Russia. The meeting was a warm-up for the 20th NATO summit in April, held in Bucharest, Romania. Lithuanian officials say it was the biggest meeting of its kind ever held in Vilnius.

References
Vilnius NATO defence ministers meeting gets underway, 2008-02-07 07:59 (Alfa).

2008 in Lithuania
2008 in politics
2008 Vilnius NATO meeting
Diplomatic conferences in Lithuania
21st-century diplomatic conferences (NATO)
2008 in international relations
21st century in Vilnius
Lithuania and NATO
2008 conferences
February 2008 events in Europe